USS Deal (AG-131/AKL-2) was constructed for the U.S. Army as U.S. Army FS-263 shortly before the end of World War II and later acquired by the U.S. Navy in 1947. She was configured as a transport and cargo ship, classed by the Navy as a Camano-class cargo ship and operated with the U.S. Pacific Fleet from post-World War II and on through the end of the Korean War.

Construction
FS-263 was a Design 381 (Vessel, Supply, Diesel, Steel, 177') U.S. Army Freight and Supply vessel built in 1944 for the U.S. Army by Wheeler Shipbuilding Corp., Whitestone, Long Island, New York.

U.S. Army service
FS-263 was commissioned at New York on 16 August 1944 with a U.S. Coast Guard crew. The ship departed New York for the Southwest Pacific on 6 September 1944 for operations throughout the war. In August 1945 she was in New Guinea awaiting cargo for the Philippines and during the closing days of the war was in drydock at Finschhafen, New Guinea. After transit to Oro Bay, New Guinea during 15–16 August 1945 inspection revealed a cracked cylinder liner causing her to be drydocked again for repairs. The Coast Guard crew was removed and the ship was decommissioned on 12 October 1945.

U.S. Navy service
The ship was acquired by the Navy 2 March 1947; and commissioned at Guam 3 August 1947. She was first classified as a Miscellaneous Auxiliary (AG) then reclassified as a Light Cargo Ship, AKL-2, 31 March 1949.

Pacific Fleet support 
While based at Guam, Deal carried cargo to the small islands in the Mariana Islands, the Marshall Islands, and the Caroline Islands until arriving at Pearl Harbor 11 August 1949. She conducted cargo operations from this base to the outlying islands of the Hawaiian chain, Palmyra Atoll, and Canton Island until 16 May 1950. She sailed to Kwajalein for a brief period, returning to Pearl Harbor 3 July.

Korean War service
With the outbreak of hostilities in Korea, Deal got underway from Pearl Harbor 14 September 1950 for Sasebo, Japan, arriving 8 November. She operated as a part of the U.S. 7th Fleet under the control of Commander, Service Squadron 3, in logistics support of the United Nations forces in Korea, and visited other ports in Japan, Formosa, the Pescadores, Okinawa, and the Philippines until 28 February 1955 when she departed Yokosuka for the United States.

Inactivation
After a short visit to Long Beach, California, she arrived at Astoria Bay 13 April to start inactivation. She was placed out of commission in reserve at Portland, Oregon, 8 September 1955 and sold 18 December 1961.

Civilian service
The further history of the ship's history sees her with the name of Olga Patricia and then Laissez Faire configured as a "pirate" radio ship off Essex in the United Kingdom housing 5 different radio stations from 3 May 1966 until 5 August 1967, then US court cases followed by allegations of "secret" use from 1971 in the Caribbean with the name of Akuarius II. By 1974 the ship had been sold and converted to a menhaden vessel and was named the Earl J. Conrad Junior operating for what is now the Omega Protein company which for many years operated the ship in the Chesapeake Bay area menhaden fishery. It was scrapped 2011.

References

NavSource Online: Service Ship Photo Archive – FS-263 – AG-131 / AKL-2 Deal
What happened to the Olga Patricia? Part of 'The Radio Rose of Texas' story, see below

External links
A Radio Rose of Texas, edited by Burroughs, Jr., Derek. Published online this omnibus continuing work contains a large number of documented and illustrated exclusive archive materials regarding the entire story of the history of the stations located on board the MV. Olga Patricia (renamed Laissez Faire); with contributions by Eric Gilder from his Don Pierson archives; Grey Pierson from the archives of William Vick; Hans Knot archives, plus individual contributions from many people who were directly involved with the financing, construction and operation of the station in 1966. References to documents supporting the legal disputes and court actions arising from the CEMCO contracts are also found on this site. Pictures are also available showing the original CEMCO transmission mast and shunt-fed cable system installed in Florida, and the mast that was built to replace it and support two cage antennas.
The Olga Patricia story. Earlier work which led to the creation of 'A Radio Rose of Texas'.
Swinging Radio England
The story of Swinging Radio England
Swinging Radio England closes down for the night on 1322 kHz at 2300 hours on November 7th, 1966 with Roger 'Twiggy' Day.
Bits of footage of Swinging Radio England from 1966 with a few seconds of Roger Day and News with John Ross-Barnard.
In the summer of 1967 Maths Lindgren (ex Radio Syd) visited the offshore stations Radio 355 on the Olga Patricia and Radio London on the Galaxy. Watch John Aston of Radio 355 on air.
Anglian TV footage with Ron O 'Quinn, the first Program Director of Swinging Radio England being interviewed onboard the Olga Patricia 1966
Still Serving after All These Years (The Bay Weekly)
Olga Patricia, formerly FS263
Sunday December 21st 2008, The Earl J Conrad Jr IS the Olga Patricia and the USS Deal!

 

Ships of the United States Army
Design 381 coastal freighters
Ships built in Queens, New York
Camano-class cargo ships
World War II auxiliary ships of the United States
Korean War auxiliary ships of the United States
Radio ships
1944 ships